Adams Violin Concerto is a ballet made by Peter Martins, New York City Ballet's ballet master in chief, set to eponymous music from 1994 by John Adams. It was commissioned jointly by the Minnesota Orchestra and City Ballet. The ballet premiere took place on 1 June 1995 at the New York State Theater, Lincoln Center; the third movement was danced earlier under the title X-Ray.

Original cast 

 

Darci Kistler
Wendy Whelan

Jock Soto
Nikolaj Hübbe
Nilas Martins

External links 
NY Times review by Anna Kisselgoff, June 3, 1995
NY Times article by Anna Kisselgoff, July 2, 1995

Ballets by Peter Martins
Ballets to the music of John Adams (composer)
1995 ballet premieres
New York City Ballet repertory